Horatio Gates Fisher (April 21, 1838 – May 8, 1890) was a Republican member of the U.S. House of Representatives from Pennsylvania.

Biography
Horatio G. Fisher was born in Huntingdon, Pennsylvania.  He attended public and private schools.  He was graduated from Lafayette College in Easton, Pennsylvania, in July 1855.  He engaged in mining, shipping, and the wholesale coal business.  He served as a member of the borough council from 1862 to 1865, auditor of Huntingdon County, Pennsylvania, from 1865 to 1868, and burgess of the borough of Huntingdon from 1874 to 1876.  He was a member of the Pennsylvania State Senate from 1876 to 1879.

Fisher was elected as a Republican to the Forty-sixth and Forty-seventh Congresses.  He served as chairman of the United States House Committee on Coinage, Weights, and Measures during the Forty-seventh Congress.  He declined to be a candidate for renomination, and resumed his former business pursuits.  He was appointed by Governor James A. Beaver a member of the board of managers of Huntingdon Reformatory in 1888.  He died in Punxsutawney, Pennsylvania, in 1890.  Interment in River View Cemetery in Huntingdon.

Sources

The Political Graveyard

Republican Party Pennsylvania state senators
1838 births
1890 deaths
Republican Party members of the United States House of Representatives from Pennsylvania
19th-century American politicians